The Angry Birds Movie (also known simply as Angry Birds) is a 2016 computer-animated comedy film based on Rovio Entertainment's video game series of the same name, co-produced by Columbia Pictures and Rovio Animation, and distributed by Sony Pictures Releasing. The film was directed by Clay Kaytis and Fergal Reilly (in their directorial debuts), from a screenplay written by Jon Vitti, based on a story by Mikael Hed, Mikko Pöllä, and John Cohen. It stars the voices of Jason Sudeikis, Josh Gad, Danny McBride, Maya Rudolph, Kate McKinnon, Sean Penn, Tony Hale, Keegan-Michael Key, Bill Hader, and Peter Dinklage. The film follows Red (Sudekis), an outcast in an island of anthropomorphic flightless birds, as he suspects a newly arrived crew of pigs les by Leonard (Hader) of plotting an evil plan, and attempts to put a stop to them with the help of his newfound friends Chuck (Gad) and Bomb (McBride). 

The Angry Birds Movie was released in the United States and Canada on May 20, 2016, by Columbia Pictures. The critical consensus on Rotten Tomatoes calls it more entertaining than expected for a film based on an app, but the responses are mixed. The film was a commercial success, grossing $352 million worldwide. A sequel, The Angry Birds Movie 2, was released on August 14, 2019, with Sony Pictures Animation (who were not involved with this film) co-producing.

Plot 

Red, an angry bird, has been an outcast from Bird Island ever since he was a hatchling due to his short temper and his huge, jet-black eyebrows. When he accidentally causes a premature hatching of another bird's egg, he is sentenced to anger management class, which is the highest penalty allowed on the island. Two of Red's classmates, Chuck, who is hyperactive and can move at hypervelocity, and Bomb, who can cause explosions with his anger and fear, try to befriend him, but he avoids them.

One day, a boat docks at the island's shore, damaging Red's house. The birds greet two green-colored pigs, the captain Leonard and his assistant Ross, who claim to be peaceful explorers bringing offerings of friendship. They introduce the birds to various innovations, including a giant slingshot, but Red becomes suspicious of the pigs' motives and sneaks into Leonard's boat. He finds more pigs hidden below deck, contradicting Leonard's claim that he and Ross are alone. When he returns and shows everyone the other pigs, the birds accept Leonard's explanation that he only lied to see if Bird Island was safe for his simple-minded cousins.

Still suspecting that there is something off about the pigs, Red recruits Chuck and Bomb to find Mighty Eagle, Bird Island's missing protector and the only bird who can fly. They find Mighty Eagle on top of Eagle Mountain, but he has become an overweight, self-absorbed slacker who has not flown for years. Red discovers the pigs planting dynamite around the island. He realizes that the pigs are planning to steal the birds' eggs while the birds are distracted by a party. When Mighty Eagle refuses to help them, Red admonishes him. Red, Chuck, and Bomb race back to sound a warning to the other birds and stop the pigs, but the pigs escape with the eggs and activate the dynamite, destroying the village. The other birds apologize to Red for not listening to him. Red forgives everyone and under his leadership, they organize an army and build a boat from the rubble to follow the pigs to Piggy Island.

The birds discover the pigs living in a walled city ruled by Leonard, whose full name is King Leonard Mudbeard. Deducing that the eggs are in the castle at the center of the city, the birds use the pig's giant slingshot to attack by launching themselves over the walls and into the city's castle. Most of the birds miss the castle but destroy other buildings. Red, Chuck, and Bomb are successfully shot into the castle the castle and discover that the eggs are inside a net; the pigs plan to lower the eggs into a giant pot, cook them, and eat them. Mighty Eagle arrives to retrieve Red's group and the eggs, having had a change of heart. One egg falls out of the net and Red battles Leonard for it, but learns to control his anger and distracts him long enough to retrieve the egg. After they fall into a dynamite room, Leonard accidentally ignites the pigs' reserve of dynamite. The giant pot in which the pigs had intended to use to cook the eggs collapses, falls and lands on top of Red. The dynamite explodes, destroying the city, but Red and the egg he was holding are shielded by the pot.

All the families, except for one, reunite with their eggs. Red emerges holding the egg, containing the Blues (Jay, Jake, and Jim), and returns the brothers to their parents. Mighty Eagle approaches Red, Chuck, and Bomb, claiming that he merely appeared lazy so that they could lose faith in him and find faith in themselves, and takes credit for saving the eggs. Red discovers that the other birds have rebuilt his house in the center of the village. The pigs survive their home's destruction, and Leonard plots a new plan.

Voice cast 

 Jason Sudeikis as Red
 Aidan McGraw as young Red
 Josh Gad as Chuck
 Danny McBride as Bomb
 Maya Rudolph as Matilda, Poppy
 Sean Penn as Terence (growls and grunts)
 Nolan North as Terence's singing voice in "The Mighty Red Song" (uncredited)
 Kate McKinnon as Stella, Eva
 Peter Dinklage as Mighty Eagle
 Bill Hader as King Leonard Mudbeard / King Pig
 Tony Hale as Ross, Mime Bird, Cyrus
 Keegan-Michael Key as Judge Peckinpah
 Blake Shelton as Earl
 Charli XCX as Willow
 Camille Hyde as Dahlia
 Nicole Sullivan as Gale
 Michael Taber as Luca
 Anthony Padilla as Hal
 Ian Hecox as Bubbles
 Tituss Burgess as Photog
 Noah Schnapp as Jay, Blue Bird 
 Billy Eichner as Chef Pig, Phillip
 Hannibal Buress as Edward
 Ike Barinholtz as Tiny
 Max Charles as Bobby
 Jillian Bell as Helene, Yoga Instructor
 Cristela Alonzo as Shirley
 Danielle Brooks as Monica, Olive
 Kevin Bigley as Greg
 Adam Brown as Hug Trader
 Romeo Santos as Early Bird
 Geoffrey Arend as Day Care Teacher Bird
 Ava Acres as Timothy
 Alex Borstein as Sophie Bird, Peggy Bird
 Malena Brewer as Arianna Bird
 Vincent Oswald as Dylan Hatchling
 Samantha Cohen as Samantha Hatchling
 Josh Robert Thompson as Brad Bird, Dane the Saxophone Bird
 Matt McCarthy as Rodney Pig and John Hamm (credited as Acrobat Pig)
 Maddie Taylor as Hamilton Pig and Oinky (credited as Acrobat Pig)
 Mckenna Grace as Ella Bird
 Ali Wong as Betty Bird
 Fred Tatasciore as Monty Pig
 Gerald Urquhart as Corporal Pig
 Brennan Mejia as King Pig
 Bella Laudiero as Maya Bird
 John Cohen as Johnny Bird
 Clay Kaytis as Clayton the Waiter Bird
 Fergal Reilly as Foreman Pig 
 Catherine Winder as Billy the Sign
 Carlos Alazraqui as Earl's 2nd Brother
 Eileen Marra, Indra Raval, Joaquin Raval and Sofie Wolfe as Hatchling Singers

Notes

Production 
The film was officially announced in December 2012, although IGN noted that this was "after months of speculation". The success of the Angry Birds Toons series, according to Rovio employee Jami Laes, "validated" the idea of creating a feature film.
The first image from the film was revealed in October 2014, with Jason Sudeikis, Josh Gad, Danny McBride, Bill Hader, Maya Rudolph, and Peter Dinklage revealed to be part of its cast. Gad at first refused to star in the movie, feeling that it was too similar to his role as Olaf in Frozen (2013) but the director eventually convinced him to sign through a 30-minute "visual pitch".
The film's budget is estimated at $80 million (€75 million). Rovio and Sony Pictures announced that they would spend roughly €100 million for the marketing and distribution of the film, giving it the largest budget in the film industry in Finland, outvaluing Big Games (2014) €8.5 million. Despite the massive budget, Rovio CEO Mikael Hed stated that "it is the one that I don't ever lose any sleep over", calling it "tremendously strong as a story". During August 2015, Rovio announced that they were expecting to cut 250 jobs equaling 40% of the company, the only sector spared being personnel working on the movie.

When multiple major studios approached Rovio to discuss the production of the film adaptation in 2010, Hed eventually decided to have Rovio establish its own in-house animation studio and have it work on the film, rather than risk losing creative control in allowing a third-party studio to produce it. David Maisel, the founding chairman of Marvel Studios, offered to help Hed and Rovio produce the film, as well as John Cohen from Illumination Entertainment and Catherine Winder from Lucasfilm, who later served as the film's producers. Animation services were handled by Sony Pictures Imageworks, while Skywalker Sound handled audio post-production services.

The Angry Birds characters were not depicted in their anthropomorphized cinematic designs until the film's announcement so as to avoid spoiling it for audiences.

 Music 

The film's soundtrack, titled The Angry Birds Movie: Original Motion Picture Soundtrack''', was released on May 6, 2016.

ATCO Records released the score on May 12, 2016.

"Wonderful Life" was replaced in international screenings of the film in English with "You Should Be Dancing" by the Bee Gees. Michael Jackson's Bad (song) is on 2 trailers.

 Marketing 
The film's marketing budget was an estimated $300 million, which,  along with its production budget of $400 million, was the biggest budget at the time for an animated Sony Pictures film. Tie-ins with McDonald's, Citroën, Ziploc, Panasonic, and a series of six Lego sets were used to promote the film. A balloon themed after Red debuted at the 2015 Macy's Thanksgiving Day Parade.
During the film's marketing campaign, the app icons for most Angry Birds games were changed to depict the cinematic version of Red. A series of free-to-play tie-in games were also produced: Angry Birds Action!, Angry Birds Evolution, and Angry Birds Match.

 Release 
 Theatrical 
The film was initially scheduled to be released on July 1, 2016, but was later moved forward to May 20. The film was released in Finland on May 13, 2016, and in the United States on May 20, 2016 in RealD 3D and 4DX. An animated short film titled The Early Hatchling Gets the Worm was shown alongside the film in selected theaters.

 Home media The Angry Birds Movie was released on digital HD on July 29, 2016, and on Blu-ray, 4K/3D Blu-ray, and DVD on August 16, 2016 by Sony Pictures Home Entertainment, with four "Hatchlings" shorts included. The film topped the home video sales chart for the week ending on August 21, 2016.

 Box office The Angry Birds Movie grossed $107.5 million in the United States and Canada and $244.8 million in other territories for a worldwide total of $352.3 million. It is the fourth highest-grossing video game film of all-time both worldwide (behind Warcraft, Detective Pikachu, and Rampage) and domestically (behind Sonic the Hedgehog, Detective Pikachu, and Lara Croft: Tomb Raider), and is also the most successful Finnish-produced film of all time. Deadline Hollywood calculated the net profit of the film to be $72 million.

In the United States and Canada, the film opened on May 20, 2016 alongside Neighbors 2: Sorority Rising (2016) and The Nice Guys (2016), and was projected to gross $35–40 million or as high as $45 million from 3,932 theaters in its opening weekend. Deadline noted that the film had the benefit of being the only animated movie in theaters until Finding Dory (2016) on June 17. The Angry Birds Movie was the top selling film for the weekend, and grossed $800,000 from Thursday night previews and $11 million on its opening day. In its opening weekend it grossed $38.2 million, finishing first at the box office and marked the third biggest Sony animated opening of all time, behind Hotel Transylvania (2012) and Hotel Transylvania 2 (2015). It also scored the second-best debut weekend ever for a video game adaptation, behind the $47 million debut of Lara Croft: Tomb Raider. It dropped 51% in its second weekend, against X-Men: Apocalypse (2016) and Alice Through the Looking Glass (2016), grossing $18.7 million.

 Reception 
 The website's critical consensus reads, "The Angry Birds Movie is substantially more entertaining than any film adapted from an app has any right to be—which may or may not be much of an endorsement."  Audiences polled by CinemaScore gave the film an average grade of "B+" on an A+ to F scale.

Lindsey Bahr of the Associated Press gave the film a positive review by writing, "Ultimately, The Angry Birds Movie does a decent job exploring the merits of anger. It's no Inside Out, but it has heart and life, which isn't too shabby for any film—app or not." Varietys Guy Lodge called the film: "A fast, fizzy and frenetically entertaining extension of the manic gaming franchise that, at its zenith, had children of all ages glued to their smartphone screens". While Rafer Guzman of Newsday found the film's plot to be "pretty thin gruel," he thought the script was quite funny and that the animation was brightly colored and appealing.

Glenn Kenny of The New York Times gave the film a negative review, writing, "The kids of today deserve better. So do I, come to think of it." In his review for TheWrap, Alonso Duralde wrote, "Let's be clear, then: The Angry Birds Movie isn't pointless because it's based on an app. It's pointless because it's pointless."

 Accolades 

 Future 
 Follow-up media 
 IDW Publishing launched a comic book miniseries, titled Angry Birds: Flight School and situated after the events of the film, on February 22, 2017.
 Rovio Entertainment has released a new online video spin-off miniseries that takes place sometime after the events of the film, titled Angry Birds Blues, and focuses on the mischievous antics of the newborn Blues.  The first episode premiered on Toons.TV on March 10, 2017.
 In the summer of 2017, GoComics announced that it will be running a comic strip series based on the world of The Angry Birds Movie, with each issue available to view on its website.  The strip ran for over a year, from August 3, 2017 to September 20, 2018.

 Sequels 

In August 2016, Rovio had begun working on a sequel to the film. The sequel, titled The Angry Birds Movie 2, was released in the United Kingdom and Ireland on August 2, 2019 and later on August 14 in the United States, coinciding with the tenth anniversary of the original game. It was directed by Thurop Van Orman and John Rice. Cohen returned as producer, with Peter Ackerman, Eyal Podell, and Jonathon E. Stewart as writers. Sudeikis, Gad, Hader, McBride, Dinklage, Rudolph, Hale, and Padilla returned to voice their roles, with Nicki Minaj, Rachel Bloom, Sterling K. Brown, Eugenio Derbez, Zach Woods, Awkwafina, Lil Rel Howery, Dove Cameron, Beck Bennett, Tiffany Haddish, Brooklynn Prince, and Leslie Jones joining the cast.

On April 30, 2020, Geeks WorldWide'' exclusively reported that a third film is in development at Sony, with production planned for 2021.

References

External links 

  at Sony Pictures
 
 

2010s American animated films
2010s children's comedy films
2016 3D films
2016 comedy films
2016 computer-animated films
2016 directorial debut films
3D animated films
American 3D films
American action adventure films
American children's animated adventure films
American children's animated comedy films
American computer-animated films
Angry Birds
Animated films about birds
Animated films based on video games
Columbia Pictures animated films
Columbia Pictures films
Films about pigs
Films scored by Heitor Pereira
Films set on islands
Finnish 3D films
Finnish adventure films
Finnish animated films
Finnish comedy films
4DX films
2010s English-language films
Films directed by Clay Kaytis
English-language Finnish films